Frank Warner may refer to:

Frank Warner (folklorist) (1903–1978), American folk song collector and performer
Frank Warner (sound editor) (1926–2011), American sound editor
Frank Warner (Shortland Street), fictional character on the New Zealand soap opera
Frank B. Warner (1863–?), American politician, Missouri senator
Frank W. Warner (1861–1919), Native American missionary
Frank Wilson Warner (born 1938), American mathematician

See also